Wei Mengxi (February 6, 1994) is a Chinese sailor. She competed in the 2020 Summer Olympics.

References

1994 births
Living people
Chinese female sailors (sport)
Olympic sailors of China
Asian Games medalists in sailing
Sailors at the 2010 Asian Games
Sailors at the 2018 Asian Games
Medalists at the 2010 Asian Games
Medalists at the 2018 Asian Games
Asian Games silver medalists for China
Asian Games bronze medalists for China
People from Taizhou, Zhejiang
Sailors at the 2020 Summer Olympics – 470
21st-century Chinese women